Glasnevin Cemetery is a large cemetery in Glasnevin, Dublin, Ireland which opened in 1832.  It holds the graves and memorials of several notable figures, and has a museum.

Location
The cemetery is located in Glasnevin, Dublin, in two parts.  The main part, with its trademark high walls and watchtowers, is located on one side of the road from Finglas to the city centre, while the other part, "St. Paul's," is located across the road and beyond a green space, between two railway lines.

A gateway into the National Botanic Gardens, adjacent to the cemetery, was reopened in recent years.

History and description
Prior to the establishment of Glasnevin Cemetery, Irish Catholics had no cemeteries of their own in which to bury their dead and, as the repressive Penal Laws of the eighteenth century placed heavy restrictions on the public performance of Catholic services, it had become normal practice for Catholics to conduct a limited version of their own funeral services in Protestant churchyards or graveyards. This situation continued until an incident at a funeral held at St. Kevin's Churchyard in 1823 provoked public outcry when a Protestant sexton reprimanded a Catholic priest for proceeding to perform a limited version of a funeral mass.
The outcry prompted Daniel O'Connell, champion of Catholic rights, to launch a campaign and prepare a legal opinion proving that there was actually no law passed forbidding praying for a dead Catholic in a graveyard. O'Connell pushed for the opening of a burial ground in which both Irish Catholics and Protestants could give their dead dignified burial.

Glasnevin Cemetery was consecrated and opened to the public for the first time on 21 February 1832. The first burial, that of eleven-year-old Michael Carey from Francis Street in Dublin, took place on the following day in a section of the cemetery known as Curran's Square. The cemetery was initially known as Prospect Cemetery, a name chosen from the townland of Prospect, which surrounded the cemetery lands. Besides the famous interred at Glasnevin, nearly 800,000 people have been buried in Glasnevin in unmarked mass graves due to the death toll from the Great Famine of the 1840s and a later cholera epidemic.

Originally covering nine acres of ground, the area of the cemetery has now grown to approximately 124 acres. This includes its expansion on the southern side of the Finglas Road with the section called St. Paul's. The option of cremation has been provided since March 1982.

Ownership and management
Glasnevin Cemetery remains under the care of the Dublin Cemeteries Committee. The development of the cemetery is an ongoing task with major expansion and refurbishment work being carried out at the present time.

Religious services
The Catholic Mass is celebrated by members of the parish clergy every Sunday at 9.45 am. The annual blessing of the graves takes place each summer as it has done since the foundation of the cemetery in 1832.

Features

Memorials and graves

The cemetery contains historically notable monuments and the graves of many of Ireland's most prominent national figures. These include the graves of Daniel O'Connell, Charles Stewart Parnell, Michael Collins, Éamon de Valera, Arthur Griffith, Maude Gonne, Kevin Barry, Roger Casement, Constance Markievicz, Pádraig Ó Domhnaill, Seán MacBride, Jeremiah O'Donovan Rossa, James Larkin, Brendan Behan, Christy Brown and Luke Kelly of the Dubliners.

The grave of Michael Collins, the nationalist leader who was killed in the Irish Civil War in 1922, is among the most visited sites in Glasnevin. Around him were buried at least 183 soldiers of the Irish Free State. In 1967 their names were recorded on memorial around Collin's grave.

In 1993 a mass grave at the site of a Magdalene laundry, institutions used to house "fallen women", was discovered after the convent which ran the laundry sold the land to a property developer.  The Sisters from the Convent arranged to have the remains cremated and reburied in a mass grave at Glasnevin Cemetery, splitting the cost of the reburial with the developer who had bought the land.

The cemetery also offers a view of the changing style of death monuments in Ireland over the last 200 years: from the austere, simple, high stone erections of the period up until the 1860s, to the elaborate Celtic crosses of the nationalistic revival from the 1860s to the 1960s, to the plain Italian marble of the late 20th century.

The high wall with watch-towers surrounding the main part of the cemetery was built to deter bodysnatchers, who were active in Dublin in the 18th and early 19th centuries. The watchmen also had a pack of blood-hounds who roamed the cemetery at night.

In 2009, Glasnevin Trust in co-operation with the Commonwealth War Graves Commission (CWGC) began identifying the graves of Irish service personnel who died while serving in the Commonwealth forces during the two world wars. These names are inscribed on two memorials, rededicated and relocated in 2011 to near the main entrance. A Cross of Sacrifice was erected in the cemetery, in a joint Irish-British commemoration ceremony, to mark the First World War centenary. As of July 2019, there are 215 service personnel of the Commonwealth of both wars identified as buried here.

Angels plot
Glasnevin is one of the few cemeteries that allowed stillborn babies to be buried in consecrated ground and contains an area called the Angels Plot.

Crematorium
In 1982, a crematorium was constructed within the cemetery grounds by Glasnevin Trust. Since then, the service has been used for people of various religious denominations who wished to be cremated.

Museum and tours
A feature of the cemetery is the Glasnevin Trust Museum, designed by A&D Wejchert & Partners Architects and opened in 2010.  It includes a café.

The cemetery also runs tours, hosts educational groups and has support for genealogists and those studying family history.

In popular culture
Glasnevin Cemetery is the setting for the "Hades" episode in James Joyce's 1922 novel Ulysses, and is mentioned by Idris Davies in his poem Eire.

Shane MacThomais, the cemetery's historian, was author and contributor to a number of published works on the cemetery, prior to his death in March 2014.

The documentary One Million Dubliners was released in 2014, featuring stories about the history and operation of the cemetery.

References

External links

 
 Glasnevin Cemetery Museum
 Glasnevin Genealogy Research
 Glasnevin Cemetery Museum at Google Cultural Institute
 
 

1832 establishments in Ireland
 
Cemeteries in Dublin (city)
Commonwealth War Graves Commission cemeteries in Ireland
Glasnevin
History museums in the Republic of Ireland
Museums in Dublin (city)
Tourist attractions in Dublin (city)
Ulysses (novel)